Midtown Sacramento is a planned train station in the neighborhood of the same name that will be a stop on Altamont Corridor Express and Amtrak California's San Joaquin services. To be constructed as part of the Valley Rail project, it was expected to open no later than 2023. By 2023, the opening date had slipped to 2026. The platform will run between P Street and the wye at S Street and be bisected by Q Street. Sacramento RT Light Rail stations are located either three blocks to the east or west.

History
The original California Zephyr ran on this alignment until 1970, hailing at the Western Pacific Passenger Depot at J Street.

References

External links

Railway stations in Sacramento County, California
Transportation in Sacramento, California
Future Amtrak stations in the United States
Railway stations scheduled to open in 2026
Future Altamont Corridor Express stations